Ray Chase (born Raymond Chaifetz; May 20) is an American voice actor who has voiced in anime, animations, video games and audiobooks. His best known roles are Noctis Lucis Caelum, the main character in Final Fantasy XV, Keith in B: The Beginning, Puri-Puri Prisoner/Dr. Genus in One Punch Man, Atsumu "Yukiatsu" Matsuyuki in Anohana: The Flower We Saw That Day, Tobikichi Usahara in Life Lessons with Uramichi Oniisan, Ryoumen Sukuna in Jujutsu Kaisen, Bruno Bucciarati in JoJo's Bizarre Adventure: Golden Wind, Mithrax in Destiny 2, and Tengen Uzui in Demon Slayer: Kimetsu no Yaiba. He is also known for his voice performances as Eve in NieR: Automata, Nier in NieR Replicant ver.1.22474487139…, L in Xenoblade Chronicles X, Donquixote Rosinante in One Piece, Artorius Collbrande from Tales of Berseria, Alphen in Tales of Arise, Rhys in Borderlands 3, Adam Roslin in the Everspace series, Freelancer in Anthem, Roy from  Fire Emblem, Yu Otosaka from Charlotte, The Master of Masters in Kingdom Hearts, Roswaal L. Mathers in Re:Zero, and Weisz Steiner in Edens Zero.

Filmography

Anime

Animation

Films

Video games

Audiobooks

References

External links
 
 
 
 

Living people
American male film actors
American male screenwriters
American male television actors
American male television writers
American male video game actors
American male voice actors
American television writers
Audiobook narrators
Male actors from Las Vegas
People from Freehold Borough, New Jersey
Screenwriters from Nevada
USC School of Dramatic Arts alumni
Writers from Las Vegas
21st-century American male actors
21st-century American male writers
21st-century American screenwriters
Television producers from New Jersey
Year of birth missing (living people)